Regan Smith (born February 9, 2002) is an American competitive swimmer. She is the world junior record holder in the women's long course 100-meter backstroke and 200-meter backstroke and a former world record holder in the long course 100-meter backstroke and the 200-meter backstroke. She competed at the 2020 Summer Olympics in three events representing the United States, winning a bronze medal in the 100-meter backstroke, a silver medal in the 200-meter butterfly, and a silver medal in the 4×100-meter medley relay. At the World Aquatics Championships, she won gold medals in the 200-meter backstroke in 2019 and the 100-meter backstroke in 2022.

Background
Smith started competing collegiately for Stanford University in the fall of 2021. Following the end of the 2021–2022 collegiate season, she left Stanford University and started training with the Sun Devils, based at Arizona State University.

Career

Early career
When Smith was twelve, she achieved multiple new age-group records and won medals at high school state meets. Following these successes, she joined Apple Valley’s Riptide Swim Club and began to receive coaching from Mike Parratto, who is known for coaching twelve-time Olympic medalist Jenny Thompson.

While she was fourteen, Smith competed at meets with Olympians such as Missy Franklin (at the time the world record holder for the 200-meter backstroke) and Katie Ledecky (the world record holder for the 400-meter freestyle, 800-meter freestyle, and 1500-meter freestyle). In 2016 she became a member of the U.S. National Junior Team and set national age group records in the 100-yard backstroke, 100-yard butterfly, and 100-meter backstroke. She was named the 2016 Age Group Swimmer of the Year for 13–14 year-olds.

2017–2018
In July 2017, at age fifteen, Smith competed in her first major international meet at the 2017 World Aquatics Championships. She qualified for the women's 200-meter backstroke event final and finished 8th. In August, Smith won gold medals in the 100-meter backstroke and the 200-meter backstroke at the 2017 FINA World Junior Swimming Championships. In the 100-meter finals she broke Missy Franklin's 15-16 national age group record, as well as the world junior record previously set by Taylor Ruck in the semifinals. She was awarded the 2017 National Age Group Swimmer of the Year for 15–16 year-olds.

The following year, Smith won her first senior international medal by taking bronze in the 200-meter backstroke at the 2018 Pan Pacific Swimming Championships in Tokyo. At the 2018 USA Swimming Championships, Smith set a new world junior record when she and Kathleen Baker (at the time the world record holder for the 100-meter backstroke) tied for first in the 200-meter backstroke with a time of 2:06.43. Smith also finished third in both the 100-meter backstroke and 200-meter butterfly. She wrapped up 2018 by earning the Age Group Swimmer of the Year title for the third time in her career and the second time consecutively in the age group (15–16 year-olds).

2019 World Championships

At the 2019 World Aquatics Championships in Gwangju, South Korea, Smith competed in one individual event, the 200-meter backstroke. In the heats and semifinals, she asserted herself as the favorite, recording a time of 2:06.01 in the heats and consequently breaking her own world junior record. In the semifinals, she surged away from the rest of the field and opened up a lead of two body lengths by the last 25 meters. She touched the wall with a time of 2:03.35, shattering Missy Franklin's world record of 2:04.06 that had stood since 2012. The next day in the final, she won her first World Championship title, claiming gold by a margin of more than two and a half seconds. She was well under her world record pace with a 100-meter split of 59.45 (a time that would have placed 6th in the 100-meter backstroke final held earlier). Smith's pace fell off at the end, but she still managed to finish with the second fastest women's 200-meter backstroke ever with a time of 2:03.69.

Despite not qualifying for an individual spot in the 100-meter backstroke, Smith was chosen as the backstroke leg for Team USA in the 4×100-meter medley relay final. She won gold along with Lilly King, Kelsi Dahlia, and Simone Manuel with a world-record time of 3:50.40 to break the previous mark of 3:51.55 set in 2017. As the lead-off leg, Smith's split time was eligible for an official world record. Her lead-off split of 57.57 broke Kathleen Baker's 100-meter backstroke world record of 58.00.

Smith was awarded 2019 American Swimmer of the Year and World Swimmer of the Year for her achievements in 2019 by Swimming World. She was also named 2019 National Age Group Swimmer of the Year (17–18 year-olds) by SwimSwam, her fourth such award of her career. For the year, she also received the Swammy Awards for World Junior Female Swimmer of the Year, becoming the first American swimmer to win the award, and Female Swimmer of the Year.

2020–2021
At the 2020 U.S. Open Swimming Championships, contested in December in a virtual competition format, Smith won a gold medal in the 200-meter butterfly with a 2:08.61, a silver medal in the 100-meter backstroke with a 59.95, and placed fourth in the 200-meter backstroke with a 2:11.74, fifth in the 100-meter butterfly with a 58.09, and ninth in the 200-meter individual medley with a 2:15.20.

2020 US Olympic Trials
In June 2021, Smith qualified for a spot on the 2020 USA Olympic Team. She won the 100-meter backstroke final at the 2020 United States Olympic Trials with a time of 58.35 seconds. This was her first time qualifying for an Olympic Games. Earlier in the competition, she set a new US Open record of 57.92 when she won the semifinals in the 100-meter backstroke. She also swam a 57.73 in the semifinals of the 100-meter butterfly, ranked sixth, qualified for the final, and did not swim in the event's final.

On day four of the Olympic Trials on June 16, 2021, Smith advanced to the final of the 200-meter butterfly with a time of 2:07.89 and ranking 2nd overall in the semifinals. At finals, she placed second with a time of 2:06.99, qualifying to swim the event at the Olympic Games. She competed in the prelims heats of the 200-meter backstroke on day six of the trials, swimming a 2:07.81 and advancing to the semifinals. In the evening semifinals, she ranked first with a time of 2:07.23 and qualified for the final. At the 200-meter backstroke final, she placed third with a time of 2:06.79 and did not qualify to swim the event at the Olympic Games.

2020 Summer Olympics

Heading into the 2020 Summer Olympics in Tokyo, Japan, Smith was one of 17 entrants in the 200-meter butterfly and one of 43 entrants in the 100-meter backstroke. In the prelims of the 100-meter backstroke on day two of competition, she advanced to the semifinals and set a new Olympic record in the event with a time of 57.96, which was broken in the last prelims heat by Kaylee McKeown, who swam a 57.88. She set the Olympic record again in the semifinals, recording a time of 57.86 and advancing to the final ranked first. In the final, she won the bronze medal with a time of 58.05. It was her first time winning an Olympic medal.

In the evening of the fourth day of competition, Smith swam the fourth fastest time out of all swimmers in the 200-meter butterfly prelims and qualified for the semifinals. In the competition session the following morning, she ranked fourth overall with a time of 2:06.64 in the semifinals and advanced to the final. She won a silver medal in the final of the 200-meter butterfly with a time of 2:05.30. On day nine of competition, she competed in the 4×100-meter medley relay final as the backstroke leg for Team USA alongside Lydia Jacoby, Torri Huske, and Abbey Weitzeil. Team USA won the silver medal with a time of 3:51.73, finishing just 0.13 seconds behind Australia's Olympic-record performance of 3:51.60. She won two silver medals and one bronze medal in total at the 2020 Summer Olympics.

2021 Collegiate beginnings
At her first collegiate swim meet, a dual meet against San Jose State University in October, Smith won her two individual events, the 200-yard butterfly and the 200-yard individual medley, as well as the 4x50-medley relay for the Stanford Cardinals. On the first day of the 2021 North Caroline State Invitational in November, Smith placed seventh in the 500-yard freestyle with a time of 4:43.86 and helped the 4x100-yard medley relay place second in 3:28.76, splitting a 50.06 for the backstroke leg of the relay. The second day of competition she placed second in the 4x50-yard medley relay with her relay teammates, swimming a 23.74 on the backstroke leg, won the 100-yard backstroke with a final time of 49.97 seconds, and helped win the 4x200-yard freestyle relay, splitting a 1:44.95 for the relay's second leg. In the evening of the third and final day of competition, Smith won the 200-yard backstroke in 1:48.91 and the 200-yard butterfly in 1:52.48. Switching over to long course meters in December, Smith won two individual events on the last day of competition at the 2021 U.S. Open Championships including the 200-meter butterfly with a time of 2:10.58 and the 200-meter backstroke in a new championship record time of 2:07.09. Earlier in the championships Smith won the title in the 100 meter backstroke, meaning she won each of the three events she competed in by the end of competition.

2022

2022 Pac-12 Championships
Smith started off the Pac-12 Conference Championships on day one with two first-place finishes, one in the 4×50-yard medley relay, where she swam the backstroke leg of the relay in 23.18 seconds, and one in the 4×200-yard freestyle relay, where she split a 1:43.19 for the third leg of the relay. On the third day of competition, she placed second in the 100-yard butterfly with a 49.87. In her second event of the evening, the 100-yard backstroke, she won the conference title in a new Pac-12 Conference record of 49.50 seconds. For her third and final event of the day, Smith split a 49.23 for the backstroke leg of the 4×100-yard medley relay to lower her Pac-12 Conference record in the 100-yard backstroke and help achieve a first-place finish in 3:25.54. The fourth and final day of competition, she won the 200-yard butterfly with a 1:50.99 and helped to win the 4×100-yard freestyle relay in 3:09.06, splitting a 47.41 for the third leg of the relay.

2022 NCAA Championships
In her first event of the 2022 NCAA Division I Championships, the 4×50-yard medley relay, Smith split a 24.31 for the backstroke leg of the relay, helping place tenth with a final time of 1:34.97. For her second event of the first day, she helped win the 4×200-yard freestyle relay in a pool record time of 6:48.30, swimming a 1:43.35 for the third leg of the relay. On day three, Smith placed third in the 100-yard backstroke with a time of 49.96 seconds. She achieved another third-place finish in her second event of the evening, the 4×100-yard medley relay, where she split a 49.81 for the backstroke leg to contribute to a final time of 3:25.63. On the fourth and final day of competition, she won the 200-yard backstroke in 1:47.76, marking her first individual NCAA title, setting a new pool record, and finishing over 1.50 seconds ahead of the second-place finisher. In her other two events, she tied for second in the 200-yard butterfly with a 1:51.19 and contributed a split of 47.74 seconds to the 4×100-yard freestyle relay for the third leg to help achieve a second-place finish in 3:08.97.

2022 World Championships

At the 2022 USA Swimming International Team Trials in April in Greensboro, North Carolina, Smith qualified for the 2022 World Aquatics Championships in three individual events, the 50-meter backstroke, 100-meter backstroke, and 200-meter butterfly. On day three of swimming competition, conducted in June at Danube Arena in Budapest, Hungary, she won the gold medal in the 100-meter backstroke with a time of 58.22 seconds, finishing less than two-tenths of a second ahead of silver medalist Kylie Masse of Canada. Two days later, she started off the evening finals session with a fourth-place finish in the 200-meter butterfly in a time of 2:06.79. Approximately 30 minutes later, she concluded the day with a tie for fifth-place in the 50-meter backstroke, finishing 0.07 seconds behind bronze medalist Analia Pigrée of France with a time of 27.47 seconds. For her final event of the Championships, the 4×100-meter medley relay on day eight of eight, she led-off with a 58.40 to contribute to the gold medal-winning time of 3:53.78.

2022 U.S. Open Championships
At the 2022 U.S. Open Swimming Championships, her first competition following a change of training setting to the Sun Devils professional group at Arizona State University, Smith set a personal best time of 2:11.66 in the preliminary heats of the 200-meter individual medley on day two. In the evening final, she improved upon her personal best time, lowering it to a 2:10.40 to win the gold medal. The following day, she won her second gold medal, achieving a first-place finish in the 100-meter butterfly with a time of 57.65 seconds. For her third gold medal, she won the 100-meter backstroke with a championship record of 57.95, which was 0.68 seconds faster than the former mark set in 2019 by Phoebe Bacon. Day four of four, she won the gold medal in the 200 meter backstroke with a championship record time of 2:05.28, finishing less than two seconds ahead of silver medalist Summer McIntosh of Canada. Later in the same session, she concluded the championships with a fifth gold medal, winning the 200 meter butterfly with a time of 2:07.30.

International championships

 Smith swam only in the preliminaries.

Personal bests

Long course meters (50 m pool)

Short course meters (25 m pool)

World records

Long course meters (50 m pool)

Awards and honors
 Golden Goggle Award, Breakout Performer of the Year: 2019
 Golden Goggle Award, Female Race of the Year: 2019
 Golden Goggle Award, Relay Performance of the Year: 2019
 Swimming World, World Swimmer of the Year (female): 2019
 Swimming World, American Swimmer of the Year (female): 2019
 SwimSwam Swammy Award, Swimmer of the Year (female): 2019
 SwimSwam Top 100 (Women's): 2021 (#2), 2022 (#11)
 Pac-12 Conference, Swimmer of the Year (women's): 2022
 Pac-12 Conference, Freshman of the Year (women's): 2022
 Pac-12 Conference, Swimmer of the Week (women's): January 26, 2022, February 2, 2022
 SwimSwam Swammy Award, Junior Swimmer of the Year (female): 2019
 SwimSwam Swammy Award, Age Group Swimmer of the Year 17—18 (female): 2019, 2020
 SwimSwam Swammy Award, Age Group Swimmer of the Year 15—16 (female): 2017, 2018
 SwimSwam Swammy Award, Age Group Swimmer of the Year 13—14 (female): 2016

See also
 List of junior world records in swimming
 World record progression 100 metres backstroke
 World record progression 200 metres backstroke
 World record progression 4 × 100 metres medley relay

References

External links
 
 

2002 births
Living people
People from Lakeville, Minnesota
Sportspeople from Minnesota
World record holders in swimming
World Aquatics Championships medalists in swimming
American female backstroke swimmers
American female butterfly swimmers
American female freestyle swimmers
American female medley swimmers
Swimmers at the 2020 Summer Olympics
Medalists at the 2020 Summer Olympics
Olympic silver medalists in swimming
Olympic bronze medalists in swimming
Olympic silver medalists for the United States in swimming
Olympic bronze medalists for the United States in swimming
21st-century American women
Stanford Cardinal women's swimmers